The Orphanage was a visual effects studio located in California.  It had offices in Los Angeles and San Francisco.  It was co-founded in 1999 by Stu Maschwitz, Jonathan Rothbart, and Scott Stewart, who all previously worked at Industrial Light & Magic. Scott Kirsner at Hollywood Reporter interviewed a couple of the founders, and writes about the company and its plans. Stu Maschwitz created the Magic Bullet software which gives video a film look, and wrote a book about guerrilla filmmaking called The DV Rebel's Guide: An All-Digital Approach to Making Killer Action Movies on the Cheap.

The Orphanage was known for its work on both commercials and features. The company then launched but later closed Orphanage Animation Studios which was headed up by Genndy Tartakovsky, and was due to make their film debut with the ill-fated Power of the Dark Crystal. They never made any projects except for Sym-Bionic Titan.

The Orphanage did approximately 640 shots for the "That Yellow Bastard" section of Sin City (2005). as well as three other films with Robert Rodriguez, Spy Kids 3-D: Game Over, The Adventures of Sharkboy and Lavagirl in 3-D, and the Quentin Tarantino/Robert Rodriguez co-directed double feature Grindhouse.

The company has worked on a number of Hollywood blockbusters including Superman Returns, Night at the Museum, Pirates of the Caribbean: Dead Man's Chest & At World's End, and the Korean blockbuster The Host.  They created the Heads-up display (HUD) for the hi-tech suit of armour in the Marvel Studios production of Iron Man, for which their work was nominated for a 2008 VES Award (for Best Compositing).

They have also created commercials and a handful of Super Bowl spots for clients as varied as Comcast, Toshiba, HP, Benadryl, Nicoderm, and several award-winning spots for Sony PlayStation's Ratchet & Clank: Going Commando.

On February 4, 2009, the company announced it was suspending operations indefinitely, after 10 years in the business. The announcement was made by company co-founders Stu Maschwitz, Scott Stewart, and Jonathan Rothbart, and announced on Mr. Maschwitz's blog. No immediate notice was posted on the company's website. Although the announcement gave no reason for the closing, bloggers attributed the closing to general economic conditions.

The Orphanage selected filmography

References

Visual effects companies
American animation studios
Computer animation
Mass media companies established in 1999
1999 establishments in California
2009 disestablishments in California
Companies based in Los Angeles
Companies based in San Francisco
Cinema of the San Francisco Bay Area